Denisa Křížová (born 3 November 1994) is a Czech ice hockey player and member of the Czech national team, currently playing in the Premier Hockey Federation (PHF) with the Minnesota Whitecaps.

Ice hockey career
Across four years of college ice hockey with the Northeastern Huskies women's ice hockey program, Křížová put up 169 points in 143 games, the sixth-highest scorer in the university's history.

Křížová became the first player born in the Czech Republic to be drafted into the National Women's Hockey League (NWHL; renamed PHF in 2021) when the Connecticut Whale selected her with the thirteenth pick overall in the 2017 NWHL Draft. She signed her first professional contract with the Boston Pride on 2 August 2018.

After only one year with the Pride, she returned to Europe to play with Brynäs IF Dam in the Swedish Women's Hockey League (SDHL). She scored 47 points in 34 games in her first season with the team, good for seventh in league scoring.

International play 
As a junior player with the Czech national under-18 team, Křížová participated in IIHF U18 Women's World Championships in 2010, 2011 and 2012. 

With the senior national team, she represented the Czech Republic in the women's ice hockey tournament at the 2022 Winter Olympics in Beijing and at the IIHF World Women's Championship Top Division tournaments in 2013, 2016, 2017, 2019, and 2021; the Division I Group A tournaments in 2012, 2014, and 2015; and the Division II tournament in 2011.

Ball hockey career
Křížová is also an elite ball hockey player and has represented the Czech Republic at the Ball Hockey World Championship for more than a decade, winning a gold medal in 2017, silver in 2022, and bronze medals in 2011, 2013, 2015, and 2019. She was named Best Forward of the tournament in 2017 and was selected to the All Star team in 2019 after leading all players in scoring.

Career statistics

Regular season and playoffs

Awards and honors
2017 Ball Hockey World Championship Best Forward
2019 Ball Hockey World Championship Scoring Champion
2019 Ball Hockey World Championship Tournament All-Star Team

References

External links
 
 

1994 births
Living people
Ball hockey players
Boston Pride players
Brynäs IF Dam players
Czech expatriate ice hockey players in Sweden
Czech expatriate ice hockey players in the United States
Czech women's ice hockey forwards
Ice hockey players at the 2022 Winter Olympics
Minnesota Whitecaps players
Northeastern Huskies women's ice hockey players
Olympic ice hockey players of the Czech Republic
People from Horní Cerekev
Sportspeople from the Vysočina Region